Kimberly "Shmi" Duran (born 1989) is a Chicana muralist based in Santa Ana, California.

Biography 
Kimberly "Shmi" Duran is a first-generation Chicana born in Artesia, California. She grew up in Santa Ana, California. Her childhood travel to Mexico heavily influenced her early art. When she was growing up, her family was heavily involved in the church; she began to paint mural backdrops for plays at the age of 11 in her father's small studio there. In 2013, she started The Heavy Collective, a community public art initiative, with Bud Herrera ("Delt one"). Their joint work is inspired by the Marcus Garvey quote "A people without the knowledge of their past history, origin, and culture is like a tree without roots."

Art 
Duran's art work is primarily a reclamation of graffiti and chicano art. Her media of choice are aerosol and acrylic. She specializes in large-scale murals.

In 2013, Duran led the community mural project Madre Naturaleza. It is located in Downtown Santa Ana on the rear wall of Macre's flower shop. The process engaged local artists, youth, business, and residents in the art-making process. The mural itself was inspired by the community interview process, with the final piece representing the dreams and aspirations of Santa Ana residents. 

The Heavy Collective has received grants to produce their work. Between 2017 and 2019, Duran used this grant money to create an art wall that was easily accessible to the community and had rotating features to exhibit multiple artwork. The first mural painted on this wall was Chinatown Burning, which memorialized the 1906 fire that destroyed the Santa Ana Chinatown and took the life of a man residing in the location where the art was displayed. That art has been painted over one of her most notable work was birthed from that project and is titled Creator Quetzalcoatl (2018). This piece is still exhibiting on the wall and has become a staple of Duran's artistic vision influenced by community, culture and heritage. The piece is a colorful painting of the Aztec god Quetzalcoatl. 

Duran's art brings together iconography from multiple cultures, like Buddhas, Ajna, and agapes. Through her work she aims to bring art to public spaces in order to expose her community to art that they are not able to view in museums or galleries. Through this interpersonal connection with her community, Duran also aims to support the youth by teaching them about art and advocating and providing public spaces for them to channel their own artistic voices as well.

While most of Duran and Herrera's works are murals, they also practice digital art, canvas work, and videography. Some of her works have been recognized in a "Mapping Arts" Database conducted by the department of Humanities and Social Sciences of California State University Fullerton. She also had a part in creating a mural for the Santa Ana Family Justice Center.  

In 2020 Duran won a poster contest for California Strawberry Festival in Ventura county. 

In 2020, Duran and Herrera created Inner Self.

References

Further reading 
 Moore Pewu, Jamila. "Reflections on Muralism" Cal State University Fullerton, College of Humanities and Social Sciences. Dec 2018. Retrieved 2021-12-8
 Chang, Richard. “Orange County Artists in the Time of Coronavirus and Social Unrest.” Voice of OC, 8 Dec. 2020. Retrieved 2021-11-18
 Chang, Richard. “The Mural Scene Expands in Santa Ana.” Voice of OC, 8 Dec. 2020. Retrieved 2021-11-23

External links 
 
 Artist's Youtube

1989 births
Living people
21st-century American women artists
Hispanic and Latino American women in the arts
Wikipedia Student Program
American muralists
Women muralists